Southport is a station on the Chicago Transit Authority's 'L' system. It is situated between the Paulina and Belmont stations on the Brown Line, which runs between Albany Park on Chicago's Northwest Side and downtown Chicago. It is an elevated station with two side platforms located at 3411 North Southport Avenue in Chicago's Lakeview community area.

Location

Southport is situated on North Southport Avenue, close to its intersection with West Roscoe Street. The station is located in the Lakeview community area of Chicago; the area surrounding the station consists of a mixture commercial and residential areas.

History
Southport Station opened in 1907 as part of the Northwestern Elevated Railroad's Ravenswood line. In CTA's skip-stop service on the Brown Line, which was in operation from 1949 to 1995, Southport was a "B" station.

In 2006, the CTA began the Brown Line Capacity Expansion Project, which involved the renovation and reconstruction of all Brown Line stations to allow eight car trains to run on the line and to ensure that all stations met Americans with Disabilities Act (ADA) requirements. Southport Station was closed between April 2, 2007, and March 30, 2008, and was completely rebuilt.

Services
Southport is part of the CTA's Brown Line, which runs between Albany Park and downtown Chicago. It is the eleventh inbound station and is the last station on the Ravenswood branch. Brown Line trains serve Southport between 4:00 a.m. and 2:25 a.m. on Weekdays and Saturdays, and between 5:00 a.m. and 2:00 a.m. on Sundays; trains operate every 3 to 10 minutes during rush hour, with longer headways of up to 15 minutes at night. 1,042,720 passengers boarded at Southport in 2015.

Notes and references

Notes

References

External links 

Southport station page at the CTA website

CTA Brown Line stations
Railway stations in the United States opened in 1907
1907 establishments in Illinois